Gilles Marchand (born 18 June 1963) is a French film director and screenwriter. He has directed five films since 1987. His film Qui a tué Bambi? was screened out of competition at the 2003 Cannes Film Festival.

Filmography

References

External links

1963 births
Living people
French film directors
French male screenwriters
French screenwriters
Mass media people from Marseille